Viðar Símonarson (born 25 February 1945) is an Icelandic former handball player who competed in the 1972 Summer Olympics.

He then have been coach of the Iceland men's national handball team from 1975 to 1976

References

External links

1945 births
Living people
Vidar Simonarson
Vidar Simonarson
Handball players at the 1972 Summer Olympics